Giles Constable  (1 June 1929 – 17 January 2021) was a historian of the Middle Ages. Constable was mainly interested in the religion and culture of the 11th and 12th centuries, in particular the abbey of Cluny and its abbot Peter the Venerable.

Early life
Constable was born in London, the son of the art historian William George Constable and Olivia Roberts. He received his A.B. at Harvard University in 1950 and his Ph.D. at the same school in 1957.

Career
Constable taught at the University of Iowa from 1955 to 1958 and at Harvard University from 1958 to 1984. He was the Henry Charles Lea-Professor of Medieval History at Harvard University from 1966 to 1977. From 1977 to 1984 he was Director of the Dumbarton Oaks Research Library. He joined the faculty of the Institute for Advanced Study as a Medieval History Professor in the School of Historical Studies in 1985 and became Professor Emeritus in 2003.

A vigorous explorer of medieval religious and intellectual history, Constable was the author or editor of more than twenty books on medieval religious and intellectual history. His most influential works, centered around the religious and cultural history of the twelfth century, illuminated the origins of monastic tithes, Peter the Venerable, the people and power of Byzantium, medieval religious and social thought, the reformation of the twelfth century, twelfth-century crusading, and the history of Cluny.

He died in Princeton, aged 91.

Honours
Constable was a member of the Medieval Academy of America, the American Historical Association, and the American Philosophical Society, the Académie des Inscriptions et Belles-Lettres, the Bavarian Academy of Sciences, the Bavarian Academy of Sciences, the British Academy, the Royal Historical Society, the Instituto Lombardo, the Accademia di Scienze e Lettere, and the Accademia Nazionale dei Lincei. He was a member of the scientific council of the Revue d'Histoire Ecclésiastique.

Bibliography
 The Abbey of Cluny : A Collection of Essays to Mark the Eleven-Hundredth Anniversary Of Its Foundation (2010), 
 Three Treatises from Bec on the Nature of Monastic Life (2008), 
 The Rothschilds and the Gold Rush: Benjamin Davidson and Heinrich Schliemann in California, 1851-52 (2005), 
 Sacrilege and Redemption in Renaissance Florence: The Case of Antonio Rinaldeschi, co-auth. William J. Connell (2005; 2008), 
 Cluny from The Tenth to the Twelfth Centuries : Further Studies (2000), 
 The Reformation of the Twelfth Century (1996), 
 Three Studies in Medieval Religious and Social Thought (1995), 
 Monks, Hermits, and Crusaders in Medieval Europe (1988), 
 Culture and Spirituality in Medieval Europe (1988), 
 Medieval Monasticism : A Select Bibliography (1976), 
 Letters and Letter-Collections (1976), OCLC 4641316
 The Letters of Peter the Venerable (1967), OCLC 6710086
 Monastic Tithes : From Their Origins to the Twelfth Century (1964), OCLC 21932950

References

External links
  Home page of Giles Constable at the Institute for Advanced Study
 Curriculum vitae of Giles Constable at the Institute for Advanced Study

21st-century American historians
21st-century American male writers
American medievalists
British historians
British medievalists
Institute for Advanced Study faculty
Catholic University of America faculty
Princeton University faculty
Harvard University faculty
University of Iowa faculty
Harvard University alumni
Members of the Académie des Inscriptions et Belles-Lettres
Members of the Bavarian Academy of Sciences
Members of the Lincean Academy
Fellows of the British Academy
1929 births
2021 deaths
Fellows of the Medieval Academy of America
American male non-fiction writers